National Standard Time is the official time zone in Taiwan defined by an UTC offset of +08:00. This standard is also known as Taipei Time or Taiwan Time.

History

The first time zone standard in Taiwan was enforced on 1 January 1896, the second year of Taiwan under Japanese rule. The standard was called  with time offset of UTC+08:00, based on 120°E longitude. This time was used until the end of the Second World War. On 21 September 1945, the Governor-General of Taiwan announced that the order issued in 1937 was revoked. Time Memorial Day was observed every 10 June from 1921 to 1941, which led to an increase in the observance of an official time.

After the war's end, Taiwan was annexed to the five time zones system of the Republic of China and was classified in the "Chungyuan Standard Time" with time offset of UTC+08:00. After the Chinese Civil War in 1949, the Government of the Republic of China retreated to Taiwan and lost nearly all the territory in mainland China. Since then, the five time zones system was no longer implemented except the Chungyuan Standard Time in Taiwan. Due to the fact that the term "Chungyuan" (Zhongyuan) refers to the Central Plain of China, the government gradually phased out the name in favor of "National Standard Time", though some radio channels continued using "Chungyuan", most notably the Broadcasting Corporation of China until 2007. Other alternatives include "Taiwan Standard Time", "Taipei Time" and "Formosan Time".

Daylight saving time was implemented in Taiwan after the Second World War on the summer of 1946–1961, 1974, 1975, 1979.

In October 2017, a petition took place to change the offset to UTC+09:00, which was responded by an assessment of potential impact by the government.

Present development
National Standard Time is now managed by the Bureau of Standards, Metrology and Inspection (BSMI) under the Ministry of Economic Affairs. The time is released according to the caesium atomic clocks aggregated by National Standard Time and Frequency Laboratory under Chunghwa Telecom after consulting the data provided by International Bureau of Weights and Measures.

National Standard Time used in Taiwan is also the same as mainland China, Hong Kong, Macau, Ulaanbaatar Mongolia, Philippines, Malaysia, Singapore, Western Australia, Brunei and Central Indonesia.

IANA time zone database
The IANA time zone database contains one zone for Taiwan, named Asia/Taipei.

Notes

Words in native languages

References

External links
 Bureau of Standards, Metrology and Inspection, Ministry of Economic Affairs, the Republic of China
 National Standard Time and Frequency Laboratory

 
Time zones